David Roberts is an English editor and novelist.

Roberts worked for several years as a book editor at Chatto and Windus, Weidenfeld & Nicolson, and Michael O'Mara Books.  Since 2000 he has been a full-time writer, best known for a series of crime novels set during the late 1930s, and featuring the joint adventures of Lord Edward Corinth and Verity Browne. The novels use actual historical events as a backdrop and there is an Author's Note at the back of the books briefly outlining what happened to the historical characters subsequently.

Publishers Weekly has described his novels as "well-researched" and "first-rate fun".

Bibliography 

Lord Edward Corinth and Verity Browne series:

 Sweet Poison (2001)
 Bones of the Buried (2001)
 Hollow Crown (2002)
 Dangerous Sea (2003)
 The More Deceived (2004)
 A Grave Man (2005)
 The Quality of Mercy (2006)
 Something Wicked (2007)
 No More Dying (2008)
 Sweet Sorrow (2009)

References

Living people
English mystery writers
Writers of historical fiction set in the modern age
Year of birth missing (living people)